The chief justice of Bangladesh ( – ) is the chief amongst the judges of the Supreme Court of Bangladesh, and also head of the whole judicial establishments, including subordinate courts. The chief justice is appointed by the president of Bangladesh.  The chief justice sits in the Appellate Division of the Supreme Court with other judges to hear and decide cases, presides over meetings of the full Supreme Court to transact business relating to administration of the court, and supervises the discipline of the judges and magistrates of the subordinate courts. Most rules for regulating the practice and procedure of both the Appellate and High Court Divisions of the Supreme Court (including subordinate courts) including those specified in certain legislative acts, such as the Companies Act 1994 and the Banking Companies Act 1991, are also duly scrutinized and approved in full court meetings presided over by the chief justice. He also distributes judicial business of the High Court Division by constituting different benches to exercise its original, appellate and revisable jurisdictions.

Administrative control (including the power of creation of post, promotion and grant of leave) and discipline of the judges and magistrates of the subordinate courts is exercised by the president in consultation with the Supreme Court and urgent matters relating thereto are dispensed with in consultation with the chief justice.

List of chief justices of Bangladesh

See also
Supreme Court of Bangladesh
Caretaker Government of Bangladesh
Chief Adviser of Bangladesh

Notes

References
Chief Justice. Banglapedia (National Encyclopedia of Bangladesh)

Government of Bangladesh
 
Judiciary of Bangladesh